Lantz v. Coleman is a Connecticut superior court case that addresses the constitutionality of forcibly feeding prison inmates on hunger strikes. The court ruled in favor of force feeding.

Case
The defendant in the case, William B. Coleman, is a British national who was sentenced to eight years in state prison in 2005 for sexually assaulting his wife. She alleged Coleman raped her two days after he filed for custody of their children. He was convicted of sexual assault and unlawful imprisonment. He appealed, arguing that his wife had falsely accused him of rape in order to gain custody of their children.  The conviction was affirmed on appeal in 2007.

In September 2007, Coleman stopped eating solid foods. Some time later, he started to refuse all liquids and nutritional supplements, other than occasional milk, juice and water during the Christmas season, to spare his family from his death during the holidays.

The commissioner of the Connecticut Department of Correction,  Theresa C. Lantz, sued for an injunction permitting the prison to force-feed Coleman.

Coleman was assisted by the American Civil Liberties Union of Connecticut in presenting his case to Judge James Graham of the Connecticut Superior Court. On May 21, 2009, the court issued the injunction allowing the prison to force-feed Coleman. The decision stated that while mentally competent persons have a right to decline medical treatment, convicts lose some of their rights while imprisoned and allowing Coleman to starve himself to death violated the prison's obligation to preserve the life of inmates and that force feeding was a medically harmless process when performed under sedation. His death from lack of nutrition would potentially cause unrest within the prison, and given his expected release from prison "his death would deprive his innocent, dependent children of his future financial support."

In 2012, Coleman was paroled but soon arrested and imprisoned after refusing to register as a convicted sex offender. In 2014, he was deported to England.

Significance 
The Coleman case has pitted several of the nation's leading bioethicists and physicians against the Connecticut prison system.  The University of Pennsylvania's Arthur Caplan, who testified for Coleman at the trial, wrote in the Hartford Courant:

See also
Ian Brady hunger strike

Notes

Connecticut state case law
Force-feeding
2009 in United States case law
2009 in Connecticut
Hunger strikes
Penal system in Connecticut